Union Township was one of nine townships in Johnson County, Indiana. As of the 2010 census, its population was 2,689 and it contained 1,068 housing units.

As of January 1, 2022, Franklin, Union, and Needham townships were merged into a single entity known as Franklin-Union-Needham Township ("FUN").

Union Township was organized in 1830.

Geography

References

External links

 Indiana Township Association
 United Township Association of Indiana

Townships in Johnson County, Indiana
Townships in Indiana
1830 establishments in Indiana
Populated places established in 1830